Wanda Maximoff is a fictional character primarily portrayed by Elizabeth Olsen in the Marvel Cinematic Universe (MCU) media franchise based on the Marvel Comics character of the same name. Wanda is initially depicted as a Sokovian refugee who, along with her twin brother Pietro, volunteers to be experimented on by Hydra. The Mind Stone amplifies her natural telekinetic and energy manipulation abilities known as Chaos magic. Wanda initially comes into conflict with the Avengers but later joins them, becoming one of the most powerful members. 

She develops a romantic relationship with Vision until he dies during the conflict with Thanos. After she is restored to life, Wanda becomes mentally unstable and unknowingly uses her abilities to trap the entire town of Westview in a false reality she creates to her liking. Her actions bring her into conflict with S.W.O.R.D. and Agatha Harkness, causing her to eventually free the town and tap into her latent powers and her ancient prophesied identity as the Scarlet Witch. She uses the Darkhold to locate alternate reality versions of her children, Billy and Tommy Maximoff, whom she created in the false reality. Corrupted by the Darkhold, she seeks to absorb the multiverse transportation powers of America Chavez, coming into conflict with former ally Stephen Strange; and possesses her counterpart from Earth-838. After causing devastation, a guilt-ridden Wanda collapses Mount Wundagore on herself, destroying all copies of the Darkhold across the multiverse in the process.

Wanda has become a central character within the MCU, having appeared in six films as of 2023. She also has a lead role in the miniseries WandaVision (2021). Alternate versions of Wanda appear in the animated series What If...? (2021) and in the film Doctor Strange in the Multiverse of Madness (2022). Olsen's portrayal of the character has been well-received and she has earned a number of accolades for her performance, notably being nominated for a Primetime Emmy Award in 2021, and a Golden Globe Award in 2022.

Background

The Scarlet Witch debuted, alongside her twin brother, Quicksilver, as a part of the Brotherhood of Evil Mutants in X-Men #4 (March 1964). They were depicted as reluctant villains, uninterested in Magneto's ideologies. Scarlet Witch was depicted as introverted and disdainful of her teammates.

Stan Lee, author of the Avengers comic book, composed the team of Marvel's most prominent heroes. However, he eventually altered the team roster, removing all but Captain America, and added villains from other comics: the Scarlet Witch and Quicksilver from the X-Men, and Hawkeye from Iron Man's adventures in Tales of Suspense. The team was known as "Cap's Kooky Quartet". Although common in later years, such a change in the roster of a superhero group was completely unprecedented. Scarlet Witch would now become a lasting member of the team.

Some years later, Avengers writer Roy Thomas started a long-running romantic relationship between the Scarlet Witch and the Vision, considering that it would help with the series' character development. He selected those characters because they were only published in the Avengers comic book, so it would not interfere with other publications.

Adaptation and appearances
In the 1990s, Marvel licensed the filming rights of the X-Men and related concepts, such as mutants, to 20th Century Fox. Fox created a film series based on the franchise. Years later, Marvel started its own film franchise, the Marvel Cinematic Universe, focused on the characters that they had not licensed to other studios, such as the Avengers. The main core of this franchise was the Avengers, both in standalone films and the successful The Avengers film. Quicksilver and Scarlet Witch were disputed by both studios. Fox would claim the rights over them because they were both mutants and children of Magneto, the villain of most of their films, and Marvel would claim those rights because the editorial history of the characters in comic books is more associated with the Avengers rather than the X-Men. The studios made an agreement so that both of them would use the characters. It was made on the condition that the plots do not make reference to the other studio's properties: the Fox films cannot mention them as members of the Avengers, and the Marvel films cannot mention them as mutants or children of Magneto. Despite this deal, films in the Fox X-Men series did not feature Scarlet Witch.

In May 2013, Joss Whedon considered Saoirse Ronan to be his "prototype" actress for the part, but by August of that year, Elizabeth Olsen had been cast for the role. Olsen has since played Wanda Maximoff in the Marvel Cinematic Universe. Olsen noted that when Joss Whedon offered her the role, he said "[wh]en you go home and Google her, just know you will never ever have to wear what she wears in the comics", and, in keeping with this, Wanda's comic book costume was ignored in favor of more casual clothing. She first appeared, as well as Quicksilver, in a mid-credits scene of the 2014 film Captain America: The Winter Soldier as a prisoner of Baron Strucker (Thomas Kretschmann). Scarlet Witch became a supporting character in the 2015 film Avengers: Age of Ultron, where the siblings initially conspire with Ultron (James Spader), a reflection of their initial villainous roles in the comics, but later defect to the Avengers. Quicksilver dies in the ensuing conflict while Wanda goes on to become a member of Captain America's Avengers. She appears in the 2016 film Captain America: Civil War. Both Olsen and Aaron Taylor-Johnson signed multi-picture deals. Olsen reprises the role in the 2018 film Avengers: Infinity War, its 2019 sequel Avengers: Endgame, and the 2022 film Doctor Strange in the Multiverse of Madness. In the films, her powers are telekinetic and telepathic abilities, which she gained by volunteering as a test subject in Hydra experiments to create supersoldiers, by exposing her to the Mind Stone. Therefore, both she and her brother are described in the films as "enhanced humans", as opposed to the naturally-occurring mutants they are in the comics.

By September 2018, Marvel Studios began developing several limited series for Disney's streaming service, Disney+, to be centered on "second tier" characters from the Marvel Cinematic Universe films who had not and were unlikely to star in their own films, such as Scarlet Witch, with Elizabeth Olsen expected to reprise her role. The title of this show was later revealed to be WandaVision, co-starring Paul Bettany as the Vision. It premiered in January 2021. As the show is premised on Wanda and Vision appearing in a sitcom (apparently constructed by Wanda to escape her grief over Vision's real-world death), her appearance throughout the series reflects the clothing styles of sitcom characters across different decades of the genre. By the finale, having fully embraced her identity as the Scarlet Witch, Wanda gains a new costume reflecting a modernized version of her comic counterpart.

Characterization

Wanda is first fully introduced in Avengers: Age of Ultron as the twin sister of Pietro Maximoff who can engage in hypnosis and telekinesis. Olsen felt Wanda was "overly stimulated" rather than "mentally insane" because "she has such a vast amount of knowledge that she's unable to learn how to control it. No one taught her how to control it properly... she can connect to this world and parallel worlds at the same time, and parallel times". Describing her character's mind control powers, Olsen said that the character is able to do more than manipulating someone's mind, with Scarlet Witch able to "feel and see what they feel and see" by projecting visions that they have never seen. Olsen expanded upon this, saying, "What I love about her is that, in so many superhero films, emotions are kind of negated a bit, but for her everything that someone else could feel—like their weakest moments—she physically goes through that same experience with them, which is pretty cool". Olsen drew on her relationship with her older brother and her sisters to prepare for the role, as well as looking to the comics for inspiration. Olsen revealed that Whedon was inspired by dancers as a way to visually represent how the character moves. As such, Olsen mostly trained with dancer Jennifer White in lieu of traditional stunt training.

In Captain America: Civil War, Wanda allies with Steve Rogers against the Sokovia Accords. According to Olsen, the character is "coming into her own and starting to understand and have conflict with how she wants to use her abilities". As such, Wanda's costume was "relatively casual" and "more clothes-based than superhero-based" according to Makovsky, since the Russo brothers believed Wanda was not a full-fledged Avenger yet. When asked about the relationship between her character and the Vision compared to the comics, Olsen said, "You learn a little bit more about what connects [Scarlet and Vision] in this film. And I think there's some really sweet moments between Paul and I, and it's more about how they relate to one another and their similarities just based on their superpowers".

In Avengers: Infinity War, Olsen explains that Wanda and Vision have maintained a romance while Wanda remains in hiding and are "trying to within that time find points of meeting in different places in order to try and forward our relationship". Paul Bettany described it as the most emotional arc for the characters. In early drafts of Infinity War and Endgame, the screenwriters had Wanda survive the snap and participate more substantially in the events of Endgame, while still mourning Vision, but this angle was ultimately dropped because "she'd gotten so much mileage and story in the first movie that she didn't really have anything that equaled that in the second".

In WandaVision, Olsen said the character is brought more in line with the comic book version, including depicting her mental illness, while introducing the "Scarlet Witch" moniker that was not previously used in the Marvel Cinematic Universe (MCU) outside of promotional material. Marvel Studios executive producer Kevin Feige said the series explores the extent and origin of Wanda's powers. Olsen felt her "ownership" of Wanda was strengthened during development of the series, which allowed her to explore new parts of the character's personality such as her humor and sassiness.  She was thrilled that WandaVision focuses on Wanda rather than making her a supporting character as in the films, and was sold on joining the series when Feige mentioned the specific Scarlet Witch comic storylines that inspired WandaVision. Olsen was influenced by Mary Tyler Moore, Elizabeth Montgomery, and Lucille Ball for her performance. Michaela Russell portrays a young Wanda.

Doctor Strange in the Multiverse of Madness continues Maximoff's "ownership of what makes her unique and the accountability of her life experience" that began in the series WandaVision (2021), with an example of this being a return to an accent that is more true to her Sokovian heritage after some of the previous MCU films had moved to an Americanized version. Olsen was largely unaware of the Multiverse of Madness story while filming WandaVision and tried to ensure Maximoff's role in the film honored the events of the series rather than having the series be affected by the film. Olsen also portrays the character's Earth-838 counterpart.

Fictional character biography

Childhood and origin 

Wanda Maximoff was born in 1989 in Sokovia, Eastern Europe, unaware that she was born a witch and unknowingly engaging in basic hex magic. While growing up with her twin brother Pietro and her parents Oleg and Iryna in a small apartment during a war, she enjoyed watching American sitcoms, which her father sold DVD box sets of so their family could practice speaking English in the hopes of emigrating to America. However, Oleg and Iryna were killed when a missile struck their apartment while Wanda and Pietro were trapped in the debris for two days. While a second Stark Industries missile flew in, it never went off as Wanda unknowingly cast a probability hex that turned it into a dud, though the twins lived in fear of it going off until they were rescued.

Years later, as young adults, Wanda and Pietro participated in political protests in their city, before eventually volunteering for Hydra's enhancement program overseen by Baron Wolfgang von Strucker. The organization exposed the twins and numerous other test subjects to the Mind Stone, with Wanda and Pietro being the only survivors and the former gaining psychic abilities while her magic was greatly amplified. During the experiments, Wanda gained a glimpse of herself as the Scarlet Witch.

Becoming an Avenger 

In 2015, Wanda is called by Strucker to assist in fighting Steve Rogers upon his arrival to Strucker's base. She then finds Tony Stark and plants a nightmarish vision in his mind. Shortly after, Ultron recruits Wanda and Pietro, who hold Stark responsible for their parents' deaths by his company's weapons, to help him. In Johannesburg, Wanda subdues Rogers, Natasha Romanoff, Thor, and Bruce Banner with visions, however, is unable to subdue Clint Barton, as he briefly incapacitates her. Following this, Ultron, Wanda, and Pietro travel to Seoul, where Ultron uses the Mind Stone to enslave Dr. Helen Cho so he can use her synthetic-tissue technology, vibranium, and the Mind Stone to craft a new body. As Ultron uploads himself into it, Wanda reads his mind and discovers his plan to cause human extinction. She and Pietro turn against Ultron and join forces with Rogers to stop him. Upon learning of Stark's plan to give the body life and fearing what he will do with it, Rogers takes Wanda and Pietro to Avengers Tower to stop him. While Rogers and Stark fight, Wanda fights Banner, but Thor suddenly arrives and turns the body into the "Vision". Wanda and Pietro tell them of Ultron's plot and they decide to travel to Sokovia, where Ultron has used his remaining vibranium to build a machine capable of lifting a large section of the capital city skyward, intending to crash it into the Earth and cause global extinction. Wanda becomes overwhelmed by her role in Ultron's scheme until Barton befriends and encourages her to join them in stopping Ultron. Wanda volunteers to protect the machine's core from Ultron, but abandons her post to destroy Ultron's primary body after sensing Pietro's death, which allows one of his drones to activate the machine. Vision rescues Wanda from the collapsing city. Afterwards, Wanda goes to the Avengers Compound, where she, along with Sam Wilson, James Rhodes, and Vision, join the Avengers.

Sometime later, Wanda is watching sitcoms in her bedroom, when she is visited by Vision, who comforts her over Pietro's death, assuring her that the grief she feels over losing her family meant that she still loved them.

Avengers Civil War 

In 2016, Wanda joins Rogers, Romanoff, and Wilson in stopping Brock Rumlow from stealing a biological weapon from a lab in Lagos. Rumlow detonates his suicide vest in an attempt to kill Rogers, but Wanda telekinetically contains the explosion and throws it upward, accidentally killing several Wakandan humanitarian workers, to her horror. As a result, United States Secretary of State, Thaddeus Ross, informs the Avengers that the United Nations (UN) is preparing to pass the Sokovia Accords, which will establish a UN panel to oversee and control the team. Stark has Wanda confined to the Compound, where Vision watches over her and they begin to develop romantic feelings for each other. After Rogers and Wilson go rogue to aid Bucky Barnes, they send Barton to pick up Wanda and Scott Lang before regrouping at Leipzig/Halle Airport, Germany. Wanda significantly helps her team through the battle, protecting them from Stark's team. After Rogers and Barnes escape, Wanda, Barton, Wilson, and Lang are captured and detained at the Raft. Eventually, they are rescued when Rogers breaks them out.

Infinity War and resurrection 

In 2018, Wanda and Vision have begun a romantic relationship and gone into hiding in Edinburgh. However, they are ambushed by Proxima Midnight and Corvus Glaive, members of the Children of Thanos sent to retrieve the Mind Stone. Rogers, Wilson, and Romanoff rescue them and take them back to the Compound, where they reunite with Rhodes and Banner. While there, Vision asks Wanda to destroy the Stone, but she refuses as it would kill him. Rogers suggests they travel to Wakanda, which he believes has the resources to remove the Stone without killing Vision. As Shuri works to extract the Mind Stone from Vision, Wanda is tasked with staying behind and watching over the operation until the Stone is removed. Nevertheless, she leaves to aid the Avengers in their fight against the Outriders, killing Midnight in the process. When Thanos arrives to retrieve the Mind Stone himself, Wanda reluctantly kills Vision and destroys the Stone, but Thanos uses the Time Stone to reverse the action and rip the repaired Mind Stone from Vision’s forehead, before knocking out a horrified Wanda and activating the completed Infinity Gauntlet. Wanda, along with half of all life in the universe, disintegrates in an event that would later be called the Blip.

Five years later, Wanda is restored to life and joins the Avengers and their allies' battle against an alternate Thanos, who came from an alternate universe, and his army, during which Stark sacrifices himself to win. A week later, Wanda attends Stark's funeral and reunites with Barton.

Life in Westview

The Hex and the WandaVision program 

The next day, Wanda goes to S.W.O.R.D.'s headquarters to retrieve Vision's body. After meeting with S.W.O.R.D.'s acting director Tyler Hayward however, she is shown Vision being dismantled and realizes she can no longer sense him. She leaves and drives to the suburban town of Westview, New Jersey to view a vacant lot that Vision had purchased in 2018 for the two "to grow old in". Overcome with grief, Wanda accidentally unleashes waves of chaos magic that transforms Westview into a sitcom-themed false reality and isolates it from the outside world via a hexagonal barrier, later called the "Hex". She materializes a new version of Vision that lacks any prior memories and starts living with him in the Hex as a newly-married couple trying to live their ideal suburban life.

While attempting to befriend her neighbors and concealing her and Vision's powers, Wanda becomes visibly pregnant. As it progresses at an accelerated rate, she encounters Monica Rambeau, who had been absorbed into the Hex and took on the alias of "Geraldine", and receives her help in giving birth to twin boys Tommy and Billy. However, Rambeau mentions Pietro and his death at Ultron's hands, inciting Wanda to telekinetically cast her out of Westview. When Vision returns moments later, he briefly appears as a corpse before Wanda resets him.

Hunted by S.W.O.R.D. 

As Wanda's children age rapidly, S.W.O.R.D. sends an armed drone into Westview in an attempt to kill Wanda. Enraged, she exits the Hex, warns Hayward to leave her alone, and emphasizes her point by hypnotizing his agents into turning their guns on him. Rambeau, who empathizes with Wanda, tries to offer help, but is rebuffed. Back in Westview, Wanda gets into a heated argument with Vision when he finds out the truth after reading a S.W.O.R.D. communique at work. The argument is interrupted when a man claiming to be Pietro appears and Wanda briefly accepts him into her life. During the town's Halloween festival, Wanda reveals to "Pietro" that she does not remember what happened to her other than feeling alone and empty, which seemingly made her create the Hex. When Wanda learns that Vision has breached the barrier and is dying, she expands the Hex to save his life, in the process also absorbing the nearby S.W.O.R.D. outpost and Darcy Lewis.

Battle of Westview 

Following her expansion of the Hex, Wanda starts losing control of the altered reality and begins having a mental breakdown. Rambeau returns to Westview to warn Wanda of Hayward's plan to revive and weaponize Vision, but an enraged Wanda refuses to listen and attempts to cast her out once more. When Rambeau resists using her newly acquired powers, Wanda's neighbor "Agnes" interrupts and takes Wanda to her house, where she reveals her true identity as the sorceress Agatha Harkness and forces Wanda to relieve her most traumatic memories to learn how she created the Hex by threatening Tommy and Billy's lives. Eventually, Harkness releases her, mocking Wanda for not knowing the full extent of her own abilities before revealing Wanda is the legendary "Scarlet Witch", who wields chaos magic and is capable of spontaneously altering reality and weaving together numerous high-level spells that run automatically. As Wanda battles Harkness, the latter absorbs her magic. They are briefly interrupted by Hayward's Vision, but Wanda's version fends him off. Continuing their battle, Harkness reveals further that Wanda is even more powerful than the Sorcerer Supreme and that she is destined to destroy the world as the "Harbinger of Chaos" before freeing Westview's citizens from Wanda's influence, allowing them to reveal to Wanda that her spell has been causing them to experience her repressed grief and nightmares. Overwhelmed, Wanda accidentally loses control of her powers once more and nearly chokes them all to death. Horrified by what she has done, Wanda brings down the Hex so the citizens can escape, but restores it after her Vision, Billy, and Tommy begin to disappear. As invading S.W.O.R.D. agents attack Westview, Billy and Tommy disarm them while Rambeau and Lewis stop Hayward and Wanda and Harkness renew their fight. The latter seemingly absorbs all of Wanda's magic, but realizes too late that Wanda had placed protective runes at the Hex's borders to neutralize Harkness's magic. Claiming her new identity as the Scarlet Witch, Wanda traps Harkness in her Agnes identity before permanently bringing down the Hex and sharing a tearful goodbye with her family. Wanda meets with a sympathetic Rambeau to apologize and vow to better understand her powers before flying away to live remotely in a mountainside cabin, where she studies the Darkhold to learn more about her powers before hearing her sons cry out for help.

Corrupted by the Darkhold 

By late 2024, Wanda had gradually been corrupted by the Darkhold learning about the multiverse and that alternate versions of her sons exist in other universes. After learning of America Chavez and her ability to freely travel the multiverse, Wanda secretly sends multi-dimensional creatures after her to take her powers for herself. When Stephen Strange seeks Wanda's help in protecting Chavez, she accidentally reveals her knowledge of the girl and explains her plans to him. Strange refuses to give Chavez to Wanda, so she attacks Kamar-Taj, killing many of the sorcerers.

During the attack, Chavez accidentally sends herself and Strange to an alternate universe called Earth-838. In pursuit of the pair, Wanda attempts to dream-walk; a spell which involves temporarily possessing alternate versions of oneself into a counterpart's body. When a surviving sorceress, Sara, sacrifices herself to destroy the Darkhold and break the dream-walk, Wanda forces Wong to lead her to a temple dedicated to the Darkholds author Chthon atop Mount Wundagore, the original source of the Darkholds spells.

Using the temple's magic, Wanda re-establishes her dream-walk and successfully possesses her Earth-838's counterpart's body. She then breaks into the Illuminati's headquarters and slaughters most of them without hesitation while Strange and Chavez escape with the help of scientist Christine Palmer. The trio enter the Gap Junction, a space between universes to find the Book of Vishanti, the antithesis of the Darkhold, but Wanda appears, destroys the book, and takes over Chavez's mind, sending Strange and Palmer to an post-incursion universe, and opening a portal back to Earth-616.

At Mount Wundagore, Wanda begins to absorb Chavez's powers but is confronted by a dreamwalking Strange who encourages Chavez to believe in herself and use her powers to bring Wanda back to Earth-838. Tommy and Billy recoil in horror of her as Wanda chokes Chavez. The boys run from her and cry out for their real mother. As a result, Wanda comes to her senses and finally broken free of the Darkholds control, collapsing with grief. She is assured by her 838-counterpart that "they will be loved." After being returned to Earth-616, Wanda lets Chavez and Wong leave before using her powers to destroy the temple along with all copies of the Darkhold across the multiverse, seemingly taking her own life in the process.

Alternate versions

Zombie outbreak 

In an alternate 2018, Wanda is among the Avengers who became infected by a quantum virus, turning into a zombie. She is then taken by Vision to Camp Lehigh, where he attempts to cure her with the Mind Stone, though she proves immune. In the present, a group of survivors come to Vision for his cure, but Wanda breaks free and kills several of them before she engages the Hulk in combat.

Sometime later, amidst the Guardians of the Multiverse's fight with an Ultron variant empowered by the Infinity Stones, Doctor Strange Supreme transports a horde of zombies and the zombified Wanda to him to distract Ultron. Wanda seems to stop, either seeing that her magic doesn't work on Ultron or seeing him unmasked and thinking that he's Vision (whose body Ultron had been occupying in his own reality) and allowing Ultron a chance to get rid of her and the rest of the zombies using the stones' full power to obliterate the planet they were on, while Strange allows himself and the Guardians escape to another alternate universe.

Earth-838 

In an alternate reality, Wanda lives a peaceful suburban life with her children Tommy and Billy. She is possessed by her counterpart from Earth-616, who is hunting for America Chavez through the multiverse. The possessed Wanda then kills most of the Illuminati in cold blood, but is eventually freed of the spell. When 616-Wanda returns through a multiverse portal, Wanda attempts to protect her frightened children from 616-Wanda, causing the latter to acknowledge the suffering she has caused and end her deadly hunt for Chavez.

Powers and abilities

Wanda is a naturally-born sorceress with the ability to harness chaos magic, typically presenting itself in telekinesis, telepathy, and energy manipulation/projection. Her magic is also capable of altering reality. Wanda’s psionic abilities were later enhanced by experimental exposure to the Mind Stone.

In Avengers: Age of Ultron, Wanda's powers are mostly telekinetic and semi-telepathic, occasionally engaging in hypnosis by inducing nightmarish-like images into the heads of four Avengers, inspiring nightmarish visions in Stark in the twins' first confrontation with the team and Rogers, Thor and Romanoff in their second, as well as provoking Banner to transform into a rampaging Hulk, before she is incapacitated by Barton. She also displays moments of energy projection, including throwing energy bolts, creating forcefields to protect herself and Sokovian citizens and taking out an army of Ultron's drones with a wave of energy. At the new Avengers Compound afterwards, she is seen briefly levitating.

In Captain America: Civil War, Wanda's powers have advanced and her telekinesis is strong enough to let her hold up the debris of a falling building as well as fly for brief periods of time. Her powers allow her to, in a fight with the Vision, forcibly manipulate his density by controlling the Mind Stone.

In Avengers: Infinity War, Wanda has significantly better control over her ability to fly. Vision explains that due to Wanda's powers being linked to the Mind Stone, she is able to use her powers to destroy it. She is shown to be able to telepathically communicate with the Stone when she tries to figure out why Vision is in pain. She later single-handedly holds Thanos at bay, who was already wielding five Infinity Stones, while simultaneously destroying the Mind Stone.

In her brief appearance in Avengers: Endgame, Wanda’s powers are strong enough to telekinetically incapacitate Thanos until he disrupts her efforts by ordering a bombardment of the battlefield.

WandaVision explores Wanda's ability to warp reality like her comic counterpart. After being overwhelmed with grief after Vision’s death, Wanda releases waves of chaos magic which accidentally creates a reinforced CMBR force-field (known as "The Hex") over the town of Westview, New Jersey, rewriting everything and everyone inside to be part of her own fictional reality that presents itself as a television sitcom. The rewrite occurs on a molecular level, meaning her powers allow her to manipulate molecules. This comes as a surprise to Darcy Lewis, Jimmy Woo and Monica Rambeau, since Wanda's previous power set was thought to be limited to illusions. Darcy informs Rambeau that her DNA has been molecularly rewritten after she passed through the CMBR field multiple times, eventually granting Rambeau light-related superhuman abilities.

Wanda’s history is later explored, revealing that Wanda was born a witch and would unknowingly engage in basic hex magic as a child, including unknowingly using a probability hex to turn a Stark Industries missile into a dud and save her and Pietro after an initial one killed her parents. The two were unaware this was because of Wanda's magic. After Hydra experimented on her with the Mind Stone, her powers were greatly enhanced. Agatha tells Wanda that she is the only person who is able to engage in chaos magic, making her the infamous and mythical Scarlet Witch.

As Wanda begins to battle Agatha, she begins to explore the extent of her true abilities, manifesting for the first time magical abilities such as teleportation, rune-casting and power absorption, with her energy blasts also becoming more concentrated. After reclaiming her powers, she has significantly better control over her magic, being able to consciously manipulate reality with ease, such as instantly altering her clothes into her uniform and reverting Agatha back into 'Agnes', this time truly under her will. Wanda is later shown leading a secluded life in a remote location, simultaneously using astral projection to study the Darkhold, now in her possession.

In Doctor Strange in the Multiverse of Madness, Wanda's powers are shown to have reached new levels, as she is able to successfully attack Kamar-Taj, defended by dozens of sorcerers and magical weapons. Wanda also practices dreamwalking, which involves taking control of one's alternate-self in other universes. Wanda successfully takes control of her variant from Earth-838, using her to pursue Strange and Chavez, invade the Illuminati headquarters, dispatch waves of Ultron drones, and kill the central members of the Illuminati. The latter involved warping reality to remove Black Bolt's mouth, causing his head to explode when he attempts a sonic blast; unravelling Reed Richards' elastic body and exploding his brain; bisecting Captain Carter by launching her own shield back at her; dueling Captain Marvel to a standstill before crushing her with rubble; and telepathically snapping Charles Xavier's neck when he attempts to use his mutant powers to enter her mind and shut it down. In this final mental struggle, it is revealed that Wanda is accomplishing all of this while continually keeping the consciousness of Earth-838 Wanda incapacitated. Wanda eventually uses her powers to destroy the temple on Mount Wundagore and all copies of the Darkhold across the multiverse.

Differences from the comics

In the comics
, Magneto and other characters from the X-Men franchise have not been introduced into the MCU because Marvel Studios didn't own the rights for the X-Men until early 2019, and therefore no mention has been made of Wanda's traditional depiction as the daughter of Magneto.

In addition, the Maximoff twins have been depicted as Romani characters in Marvel Comics since 1979. They were ethnically ambiguous for the first 15 years of their publication history, after which they were shown to have been adopted and raised by a Romani couple. It was later revealed that their biological father was Magneto and their mother was Magda Eisenhardt, a Romani woman he met in a concentration camp during World War II. A later retcon it is shown that Magneto was not their father after all, and they are not mutants. Their mother was actually Natalya Maximoff, the biological sister of the twins' adoptive father. She passed on the title "The Scarlet Witch" to her daughter, and the biological father is assumed to also be from the Romani community. This makes the twins fully Romani by blood.

In the Marvel Cinematic Universe
Wanda in the MCU initially "possesses a drastically different powerset to her comic book counterpart", having been described less as a wielder of actual magic and more as "a Jean Grey analogue, gifted with both telepathic and telekinetic powers", with her abilities in the MCU being derived at least in part from experiments in which she was exposed to the Mind Stone.

In WandaVision, however, Wanda is revealed to be a powerful sorceress, the only being currently capable of wielding chaos magic. The series explores her ability to manipulate reality like her comic counterpart. While it is maintained that her abilities emerged from the Mind Stone, in the MCU she is retconned into having possessed the latent ability to wield chaos magic since birth, and the Mind Stone simply unlocked these dormant abilities, and her subsequent persistent use of basic telekinesis, telepathy and hypnosis were seemingly an unwitting result of the same unique magical source.

Reception
Following the release of Avengers: Endgame, Rachel Leishman of the feminist "geek site" The Mary Sue wrote that Wanda "isn't the most fleshed out of characters because she is often tied down to a male character and very rarely does anything but kill people accidentally," but that Avengers: Infinity War provided "the Wanda who understands her placement among the Avengers and her abilities", and by Avengers: Endgame, Wanda is "taking on her position as one of the new leaders of the Avengers". Jen Chaney of Vulture reviewed WandaVision positively, stating that "Olsen and Bettany's characters were often treated like benchwarmers on an all-star team in the Avengers movies. Here, they really shine". Eric Deggans of NPR state of the character that "a confused and grief-stricken product of experimentation, saddled with powers she doesn't understand and struggles to control, becomes the Scarlet Witch - one of the most powerful figures in the Marvel Cinematic Universe". IndieWire praised Elizabeth Olsen's performance as Wanda, stating, "her work on “WandaVision” which showcases her tremendous dramatic talent and, even more impressive, introduces her as a true comic delight". The Ringer complimented the evolution of the character through all of her appearances, explaining, "She’s gone from a mysterious figure that even Thanos treated as an afterthought to one of the MCU’s most compelling characters".

For her performance in Doctor Strange in the Multiverse of Madness, Olsen received critical acclaim, with some film critics stating it could lead the actress to receive her first Academy Award nomination. Davis Caballero of Screen Rant referred to Olsen as the "definitive shining star" of the MCU's Phase Four for her performance across WandaVision and Doctor Strange in the Multiverse of Madness, writing, "No one comes close to what Olsen achieved in WandaVision and Multiverse of Madness; indeed, the actor has set the bar too high". Rachel Leishman of The Mary Sue wrote that Olsen managed to understand and portray the pain felt by her character through the movie, calling her a "powerhouse". Richard Roeper of the Chicago Sun-Times praised the performance of Elizabeth Olsen in Doctor Strange in the Multiverse of Madness, even commenting that he believed the character of Wanda had the most compelling of the film’s character arcs. Chris E. Hayner of GameSpot ranked Wanda Maximoff 7th in their "38 Marvel Cinematic Universe Superheroes" list, stating, "Even before WandaVision, Wanda proved time and again how powerful she was and what she was willing to do for those she loved. She may have taken that too far in the latest Doctor Strange movie, but she made the right choice in the end, proving she's ultimately a hero".

Accolades

Notes

See also
 Characters of the Marvel Cinematic Universe

References

External links
 Wanda Maximoff on the Marvel Cinematic Universe Wiki
 
 Wanda Maximoff  on Marvel.com

Avengers (film series)
Female characters in film
Female characters in television
Fictional Eastern European people
Fictional characters displaced in time
Fictional characters who can manipulate reality
Fictional characters with absorption or parasitic abilities
Fictional characters with energy-manipulation abilities
Fictional characters with major depressive disorder
Fictional characters with post-traumatic stress disorder
Fictional characters with spirit possession or body swapping abilities
Fictional defectors
Fictional hypnotists and indoctrinators
Fictional immigrants to the United States
Fictional kidnappers
Fictional mass murderers
Fictional outlaws
Fictional people from the 20th-century
Fictional people from the 21st-century
Fictional self-sacrifices
Film characters introduced in 2014
Film supervillains
Marvel Cinematic Universe characters
Marvel Comics characters who have mental powers
Marvel Comics characters who use magic
Marvel Comics female superheroes
Marvel Comics female supervillains
Marvel Comics telekinetics
Marvel Comics telepaths
Marvel Comics witches
Orphan characters in film
Orphan characters in television
Scarlet Witch
Twin characters in comics
WandaVision